Murang'a County is one of the counties of Kenya's former Central Province. Its largest town and capital is Murang'a, which was referred to as Fort Hall during the colonial era. The county is inhabited mainly by and is considered the birthplace of the Gikuyu, the largest ethnic group in Kenya. The county has a population of 1,056,640 based on the 2019 census.

History

When missionaries first came to Kenya, they found the Coast Region already inhabited by Portuguese, who had taken the coast, strategic for trade, from Arab powers in the 16th century. The missionaries ventured into Kenya's rugged interior and Murang'a was one of the first places they settled.

When the British set up the East African Protectorate in 1895, their first administrative post (Fort Smith) was located in Murang'a.

One of the main highlights of Murang'a's history, however, is the Mau Mau uprising that was led by the Agikuyu community who consider Murang'a their ancestral origin. Murang'a is thus considered, at least by some, the birthplace of the Kenyan independence movement.

Missionaries had initially been welcomed by Karuri Wagakure who was the chief of Tuthu. They set up the first mission church in Kenya at Murang'a.

Murang'a is also the source of Rivers Maragua, which originates from the heart of the Aberdare Range, Mathioya, Kayahwe, Irati and Muriurio among others.

Additionally, Murang'a is known for its fertile soil and good climate, which are good for farming. Among the food crops grown in this county include maize, beans, sweet potatoes, arrow roots, pumpkins, and bananas.

Tea and coffee are the county's main cash crops.

County Government 
The Constitution of Kenya (2010) created 47 regional governments with the formerly larger Murang'a district as a county. The County Government has two arms, and these are; the County Assembly and the County Executive.

.

Executive 
From 2013–2022, the Executive arm was headed by Hon. Mwangi wa Iria, who was deputized by Hon. Maina Kamau in his second term. During his second and final term as the governor, Mwangi wa Iria was assisted by a team of ministerial members referred to as County Executive Committee (CEC), which had ten other members. The individuals and their portfolios included:

Following the end of the two terms of governorship by Mwangi wa Iria as stipulated by the Kenyan Law, Murang'a County voters voted in Dr. Francis Irungu Kang’ata as their second Governor in August 2022 general elections. Governor Francis Irungu took Oath of Office on 25 August 2022, together with his deputy Stephen Mburu Munania, who became the third Deputy Governor of Murang'a County.

County Assembly 
Murang’a County Assembly is located in Murang’a town along Kiria-ini Road. The Assembly is housed in the building formerly occupied by the Municipal Council of Murang’a.

Murang’a County has 35 MCAs, a speaker and 16 nominated members. The position of the Speaker of the Assembly was formerly held by Hon. Leonard Nduati, deputized by Hon. Moses Gachui. Johnson Mukuha was voted in as the new Speaker in September 2022 by the majority of Members of County Assembly (MCAs). The Assembly is administratively managed by Clerk to the Assembly, a post formerly occupied by Peter Ndegwa Mbue. The current Clerk to the Assembly is Mr. Kuria Thuita.

MEMBERS OF MURANG'A COUNTY ASSEMBLY(2022-2027)

 Speaker - Johnson Mukuha - UDA
 Deputy speaker - Moses Gachui Mungai - UDA
 Majority Leader -  Francis Kibe Kamau - UDA
Elected Members of County Assembly.

Population

Learning Institutions 
Currently, there is only one public university in the county, known as Murang’a University of Technology (MUT). MUT was established in September 2011 via Murang’a University College order legal notice No. 129 September 2011 as a constituent College of Jomo Kenyatta University of Agriculture and Technology. MUT is the successor of Murang’a University College and Murang'a College of Technology. The university currently operates under the provision of the Universities Act 2012 CAP 210 B of the laws of Kenya.

The university is located 1.5 km from Murang'a town, 85 km North East of Nairobi, 70 km South East of Nyeri and 50 km South West of Embu.

There is also Kenya Medical Training College Murang’a Campus (KMTC). This Medical Training College is situated in Murang’a town, approximately 1 km from the town center. Having started in 1950s as a training Centre for Mid-wives, the college morphed into training nurses and gradually started offering Certificate and Diploma Courses in Nursing and Mental Health Psychiatry.

Another public institution is the Michuki Technical Training Institute which is located near Karugia Shopping Centre.

County subdivisions

The county has seven constituencies: 
Kangema Constituency
Kiharu Constituency
Mathioya Constituency
Kigumo Constituency
Kandara Constituency
Maragwa Constituency
Gatanga Constituency

The county has several towns: 
Kangare
Kirwara
Kenol
Maragwa
Kangema
Kiriani

Central Kenya Region

Urbanisation

Wealth/Poverty Level

Cash crops in Murang'a county:
Tea
Coffee

Notable people
Kenneth Matiba – Politician, First Kenyan Opposition Leader, Business Man, civil servant
Charles Rubia – First African Mayor of Nairobi
Mwangi wa Iria – Former Governor
Irungu Kan'gata – Current Governor 
Kembi Gitura – Former Senator Murang'a County
Peter Kenneth – Presidential candidate 2013 elections, Former Assistant Minister and Member of Parliament
Sabina Wanjiru Chege – Former Chairperson of Health Committee in National Assembly, MP, Woman Representative Murang'a County
Joseph Kamaru – The Late Renowned Benga Musician
John Njoroge Michuki – Former Cabinet Minister
Elias Mbau – Former MP
Ndindi Nyoro – Current MP Kiharu and Chairperson of the National Assembly Budget and Appropriations Committee.
Clement Muchiri Wambugu – Former MP, Mathioya Constituency
James Mwangi – Entrepreneur, Businessman and Current C.E.O of Equity Bank
Peter Munga – Businessman, Entrepreneur
Jimnah Mbaru – Politician, Businessman, Entrepreneur
Alice Muthoni Wahome – Former MP Kandara, and Current Cabinet Secretary for Water, Sanitation, and Irrigation.
Wangu wa Makeri – A woman colonial chief
Peter Kagwanja – A Scholar, Former Presidential Adviser
Jamleck Kamau – Former Kigumo MP

Potential misinformation on social media platforms. 
PesaCheck reviewed a screenshot purportedly from Kameme TV showing Murang’a gubernatorial poll results which indicated that 48% of the people had faith in Irungu Kang’ata’s leadership.’ In order to make it seem true and believable, the infographic was branded with the logo of the Media Council of Kenya (MCK) who flagged the screenshot as fake via its official Twitter and Facebook pages. Fact checkers from PesaCheck went ahead to review these claims and found out that the Twitter account handle was from someone impersonating Kameme TV and also that all the information was fake.

See also
Kikuyu people
Dedan Kimathi
Jomo Kenyatta
Kiriaini

References

External links
Office for the Coordination of Humanitarian Affairs – Kenya AdminLevels 1-4 

 
Counties of Kenya